Stéphane Darbion  (born 22 March 1984) is a former French professional footballer.

Career
Born in Belley, Ain, Darbion began his career with HSC Montpellier and was promoted in 2003 to the Ligue 2 senior side. In July 2007, after four years with the first team, during which he had made 70 appearances scoring four goals, he joined to AC Ajaccio.

On 12 June 2009, he signed for FC Nantes from AC Ajaccio on a two-year deal.

In summer 2012, after one season in Greece, Darbion signed a two-season contract with Troyes AC, newly promoted to French Ligue 1.

Coaching career
After retiring at the end of the 2019-20 season, Darbion stayed at Troyes AC in a different role: he was appointed assistant coach of manager Laurent Batlles.

Career statistics

References

Extnernal Links
 

1984 births
Living people
People from Belley
Sportspeople from Ain
Association football midfielders
French footballers
Montpellier HSC players
AC Ajaccio players
FC Nantes players
Olympiacos Volos F.C. players
Xanthi F.C. players
ES Troyes AC players
Ligue 1 players
Ligue 2 players
Championnat National 2 players
Championnat National 3 players
Super League Greece players
French expatriate footballers
Expatriate footballers in Greece
Footballers from Auvergne-Rhône-Alpes